The following is a timeline of the history of the city of Brasília, Federal District, Brazil.

20th century

 1957 - City construction begins.
 1958 - Palácio da Alvorada built.
 1960
 21 April: Brasília inaugurated.
 Population: 141,742.
 Base Hospital of the Federal District and Palácio do Planalto open.
 Correio Braziliense newspaper begins publication.
 Catholic Diocese of Brasília established.
 1961 - University of Brasília established.
 1966 - Martins Pena Theater opens.
 1967 - Brasilia TV Tower erected.
 1970
 Cathedral of Brasília and Itamaraty Palace inaugurated.
 Population: 272,002.
 1971
 Conjunto Nacional shopping mall in business.
 Brasília Airport terminal built.
 1972 -  newspaper begins publication.
 1973 - Nilson Nelson Gymnasium built.
 1974 - Estádio Nacional Mané Garrincha (stadium) and Brasília Autodrome open.
 1975 - Brasília FC (football club) formed.
 1977 - Palácio do Jaburu inaugurated.
 1978 - Hospital Daher founded.
 1980 - Population: 1,203,333.
 1983 - ParkShopping mall in business.
 1991 - Population: 1,598,415.
 1997 - August: Squatter unrest.
 1999 - Centro de Futebol Zico de Brasília Sociedade Esportiva (football team) formed.
 2000
 Population: 2,043,169.
 Centro Cultural Banco do Brasil opens.

21st century

 2001 - Federal District Metro begins operating.
 2002 - Juscelino Kubitschek bridge built.
 2006
 Cultural Complex of the Republic inaugurated.
 Legião FC (football team) formed.
 2007 - Chico Mendes Institute for Biodiversity Conservation headquartered in Brasilia.
 2010
 April: International 2nd BRIC summit held in city.
 Population: 2,570,160.
 2012 - Brasilia Digital TV Tower erected.

References

This article incorporates information from the Portuguese Wikipedia.

External links

 Map of Brasilia, 1982

History of Brasília
Brasilia
Brasilia